The Houston Chamber Choir is a professional chamber choir based in Houston, Texas. It was founded in 1995 by Artistic Director Robert Simpson. The ensemble regularly presents a five-concert series of diverse, innovative choral programming throughout the Houston region. They have appeared nationally at the American Choral Directors Association convention, the Chorus America convention, Spoleto Festival USA, Trinity Church in Manhattan, and Yale University. The choir has also has toured internationally in Mexico and Wales.

The choir won its first Grammy Award for the 2019 recording Duruflé: Complete Choral Works.

Recordings
 The Blue Estuaries: American Choral Music (Zephyr, 2001)
 Ravishingly Russian (MSR Classics, 2009)
 Psalmi ad Vesperas (MSR Classics, 2012)
 Soft Blink of Amber Light (MSR Classics, 2015)
 Rothko Chapel: Morton Feldman, Erik Satie, John Cage (ECM, 2015)
 Behold the Star! Christmas at the Villa (2018)
 Duruflé: Complete Choral Works (Signum Classics, 2019)
 Bob Chilcott: Circlesong (Signum Classics, 2022)

Collaborations
The Houston Chamber Choir has performed and collaborated with some of the world's leading artists, including Anton Armstrong, Jamie Bernstein, Alex Blachly, Marguerite Brooks, Dave Brubeck, Simon Carrington, Bob Chilcott, Cynthia Clawson, Manfred Cordes, Ken Cowan, Joseph Flummerfelt, María Guinand, Paul Hillier, Kim Kashkashian, Christian McBride, Bill McGlaughlin, Kim Nazarian, Peter Phillips, Elena Sharkova, and Steven Schick.

Commissions
Beyond the known and celebrated choral works, the Houston Chamber Choir is also a champion of contemporary choral music, having expanded the repertoire with nearly a dozen commissions of new works.  All but one of the compositions from Soft Blink of Amber Light are works commissioned and premiered by the ensemble. Composers commissioned by the choir include Dominick DiOrio, Jocelyn Hagen, Daniel J. Knaggs, Christian McBride, Christopher Theofanidis, and David Ashley White.

Awards and accolades 
In 2015, the choir was the winner of The American Prize for Choral Performance.

Its two 2015 albums, Soft Blink of Amber Light and Rothko Chapel: Morton Feldman, Erik Satie, John Cage have been met with international acclaim. The Rothko Chapel project, recorded in partnership with Da Camera of Houston Artistic Director Sarah Rothenberg, was a US Billboard Top 10 and UK Top 20 Classical Album and was named one of the Best Classical Recordings of 2015 by the Chicago Tribune.

The choir is the recipient of the 2018 Margaret Hillis Award for Choral Excellence given by Chorus America.

The 2019 recording Duruflé: Complete Choral Works was the choir's first Grammy Award Nomination and it won the Grammy for Best Choral Performance.

The Houston Chamber Choir was selected to perform as one of the twenty-four choirs at the World Symposium on Choral Music sponsored by the International Federation for Choral Music in Auckland, New Zealand, in July 2020.

References

External links
 Official website
 

1995 establishments in Texas
Chamber choirs
Choirs in Texas
Culture of Houston
Music of Houston
Grammy Award winners
Musical groups established in 1995
Musical groups from Houston
Performing arts in Texas
Texas classical music